The "Big Excursion" also known as the 1989 migration or Big Migration was the ethnic cleansing of Bulgarian Muslims by the Communist government of the People's Republic of Bulgaria. Between May and August 1989, 360,000 Bulgarian Muslims crossed the border into Turkey. In late December 1989, a month after the resignation of General Secretary Todor Zhivkov, the "Big Excursion" came to a genuine end, with the new government promising to restore the rights of Bulgarian Muslims. By the end of 1990, around 150,000 Bulgarian Muslims had returned from abroad.

While the "Big Excursion" is sometimes alleged to have been a case of voluntary mass-migration, it has been widely recognized as ethnic cleansing, including by the democratic government of now-EU-member Bulgaria in 2012. Though the Excursion is not as widely remembered in the West as the subsequent Bosnian genocide and expulsion (and subsequent return) of Kosovar Albanians in neighboring Yugoslavia, as of 1989 it was the largest case of ethnic cleansing in Europe since the expulsion of Germans living east of the Oder-Neisse line between 1944 and 1950.

Terminology
Though use of the term "ethnic cleansing" dates back to the early 19th century, the term is usually understood to have come into common use with the breakup of Yugoslavia which had not yet occurred by 1989. The term "ethnic cleansing" is thus not usually associated with the 1989 ethnic cleansing in Bulgaria. Instead, the event is usually referred to by the official euphemistic terms employed by the regime of Todor Zhivkov.

The Bulgarian government officially referred to the flight of Bulgarian Muslims as the "Big Excursion" because officially the border with Turkey was opened "to allow tourists to visit the neighboring country," and the victims of the Excursion had only left temporarily to visit relatives. 

Some, however, have criticized the use of that official and highly ambiguous term. Polish academic Tomasz Kamusella describes use of the term "Big Excursion" as tantamount to acceptance of General Secretary Zhivkov's propaganda, and some Bulgarian Muslims take offense to use of the term "Big Excursion". Even in the modern day, the name by which this event is called is the subject of contention. Those who wish to belittle its memory do not capitalize the term "Big Excursion".

In this article, the term "Big Excursion" is used to refer to the ethnic cleansing of Bulgarian Muslims in 1989 but it is capitalized and presented in quotations.

Background

The "Revival Process"

In 1984, the authoritarian communist regime in Sofia embarked on an assimilationist campaign known officially as the "Revival Process". Bulgarian Muslims were made to formally change their names to sufficiently "Bulgarian" ones (primarily those of Slavic and Christian origin). This action provoked backlash from the Muslim population and sparked protests, a rarity in the thirty years in which Todor Zhivkov had led the country as General Secretary of the ruling Communist Party.
Tensions continued to simmer, even after the renaming process had been completed, and many Muslims were arrested and even deported from Bulgaria during the 1980s prior to 1989. As the 1980s wore on, however, the Eastern Bloc and Soviet support both waned, undermining the communist regime in Bulgaria.

Often in current Bulgarian discourse, the "Big Excursion" is merged with the longstanding assimilationist policies of the Bulgarian state towards its Muslim minority or the "Revival Process" in particular. It is sometimes treated as merely the endpoint of the latter. In contrast to assimilation campaigns, however, the "Big Excursion" was unprecedented before 1989. Similarly, the Holocaust was of a distinct and unprecedented character from the series of pogroms and anti-semitic campaigns which preceded it and is treated as such by historians.

History

Start of the Excursion
Following on from the simmering tensions between the regime and Muslim population, the state increasingly cracked down. Many Muslim political leaders were deported in the beginning of 1989, primarily to Austria and Sweden, and the state threatened individual Muslims. One Bulgarian Turk, Rasim Ozgur, recalled that in early May 1989, communist state militiamen told him that they would kill him if he was seen conversing with "'reported people,'" and they also told him that he "was about to emigrate." He thus prepared to leave Bulgaria, doing so once the border with Turkey was opened later that month.

On May 29, 1989, General Secretary Todor Zhivkov announced the opening of the border with Turkey, ostensibly "to allow tourists to visit the neighboring country." Large numbers of Muslims, many of whom, like Rasim Ozgur, had already prepared to leave the country in the face of state intimidation, surged to the Turkish border. Turkey in-turn fully opened the Kapıkule border crossing near the Bulgarian town of Kapitan Andreevo on June 3.

End of the Excursion
By late August, over 300,000 Muslims had crossed the Bulgarian-Turkish border, leading to a refugee crisis in Turkey. On August 22, Turkey officially closed its border with Bulgaria to stop the flow of "Bulgarian citizens without a Turkish visa". As a result, the number of Muslims crossing into Turkey dropped dramatically, though some did obtain Turkish visas and subsequently cross the border. Indeed, some Bulgarian Muslims who had already packed to leave the country were unable to do so because of the closure, suggesting that the total number of those expelled from Bulgaria would have been higher if not for Turkey's action. Subsequently, Bulgaria did not attempt to more directly expel the Muslim population, though repression would continue until on December 29, 1989, exactly seven months since Zhivkov announced the opening of the Turkish border and just over one month after Zhivkov's resignation, when the government of Petar Mladenov announced that the rights of Muslims would be restored, though it would take two years for that promise to be fully fulfilled.

Return of Bulgarian Muslims
Even before the ultimate end of the Excursion, large numbers of expellees returned to Bulgaria, with the number accelerating thereafter. By the end of 1990, communist rule had come to an end, with the People's Republic of Bulgaria transformed into simply the Bulgarian Republic, and around 150,000 Muslims had returned. By the end of 1991, as many as 200,000 had returned.

Foreign Response
As Bulgaria was a member of the Warsaw Pact and Turkey was a member of NATO, armed conflict involving the two over the "Big Excursion" had the potential to draw in the United States and Soviet Union, the two principal nuclear-armed superpowers of the era. That no armed conflict emerged might suggest that negotiations occurred between the superpowers prior to the Excursion. However, because records in both Russia and the United States remain sealed and the topic has received little scholarly attention, this allegation cannot be confirmed.

The excursion was covered by Western media organizations in 1989, but was front-page news only in Turkey and Yugoslavia. Amidst the tumult in Eastern Europe of that year, western press focused on other developments.

Voluntary or Forced
In the face of criticism, the Bulgarian regime insisted that the victims of the "Big Excursion" voluntarily emigrated and pointed to the large portion of the Bulgarian Muslim population that remained in the country unaffected. The argument that the Excursion had been voluntary rather than forced, continued to be made well into the 21st century. The modern Bulgarian state, however, officially recognized the "Big Excursion" as ethnic cleansing in 2012.

The migration of Bulgarians of all ethnicities seeking economic opportunity to Turkey following the fall of Communism blurred together with the "Big Excursion" in the eyes of many and bolstered the argument that the exodus had been voluntary. Many in Bulgaria further insist on treating the "Big Excursion" merely as the "end-point" of the Revival Process.

Legacy
The "Big Excursion" is the least known of the late-20th century ethnic cleansings in the Balkans, and it is not widely remembered outside of Bulgaria. Even within the country, the events of 1989 are not particularly well known. Academic Tomasz Kamusella writes that "The generations of Bulgarians born after 1989 know next to nothing about the [Revival Process] and the 1989 ethnic cleansing."

Bulgaria
In 2012, the Bulgarian government officially recognized the "Big Excursion" as ethnic cleansing, and called for the prosecution of those responsible. However, that recognition was largely ignored by scholars, and to date Bulgaria does not officially commemorates the ethnic cleansing and the state has not brought criminal charges against any individual involved in carrying out the "Big Excursion". Indeed, Bulgaria has even frequently commemorated the now-deceased Todor Zhivkov on the anniversary of his birth, with former prime minister Boyko Borisov even referring to Zhivkov as the "Great Daddy of the Bulgarian Nation."

Less than a week after the 2012 recognition of the event as ethnic cleansing by the Bulgarian Parliament, the far-right ultranationalist political party, Ataka, introduced a new bill officially contesting the declaration. According to the bill's authors the declaration and recognition of the 1989 ethnic cleansing would represent a "boost" for "'separatists'", presumably in reference to the nation's Turks and Muslims. This reasoning is in-line with that of Bulgarian nationalists more generally, who often cast the Turkish and Muslim minority in the "role of perennial anti-Bulgarian separatists."

Turkey
Even in Turkey, few accounts of excursion have been published. What books have been produced primarily regard the individual accounts of expellees, which have typically been printed in limited runs.

See also
Bulgarian Muslims
Bulgarian Turks
Bulgarian Turks in Turkey
Crimean Tatars in Bulgaria
Muhacir
Pomaks
Romani people in Bulgaria
Turks in Bulgaria
Turkish National Liberation Movement in Bulgaria

Notes

References

Bibliography

External links
 The Declaration Condemning the Attempted Forced Assimilation of Bulgarian Muslims (2012)

Bulgaria and NATO
Events in Bulgaria
Ethnic cleansing
Ethnic cleansing in Europe